Lennox Bacela (born 13 April 1983) is a South African football (soccer) player who played as a striker. in the Premier Soccer League.

Early life 
Lennox was born in Knysna in 1983 and grew up in a very liberal and open-minded family. School years were spent at York High in George and, after matriculating, Lennox spent a year interning at First National Bank which later led to his financial clerk position at George Municipality. Another year in finance made him realize he wanted to follow a more active path in life, so he further explored his sporting talents and enlisted in the Vodacom League Games (second division).

Professional career 
Lennox's first soccer big break was playing for Cape Town-based Santos FC for the season 2008-2010 and since then he progressed through the ranks and has been signed to Bloemfontein Celtic (2010-2013) where he was among the top scorers. Since then he and has found homage at Orlando Pirates FC (2013 -2015) and is now at University of Pretoria F.C. Lennox made his international debut in 2013 during an international friendly for Bafana Bafana against Swaziland

References 

1983 births
Living people
People from Knysna
Xhosa people
South African soccer players
Association football forwards
Bloemfontein Celtic F.C. players
Orlando Pirates F.C. players
Santos F.C. (South Africa) players
Soccer players from the Western Cape